Thomas Alsgaard (born 10 January 1972) is a Norwegian former professional cross-country skier. Alsgaard is regarded by many as the best performer of the freestyle technique (skating) in cross-country skiing and many of today's best skiers have studied his technique. In total, Alsgaard won 15 medals in the Winter Olympics and FIS Nordic World Ski Championships, making him one of the most successful skiers of all time.

Early life
Born in Flateby, Enebakk, Alsgaard began cross-country ski racing at the age of three. That was when he was entered into a race against many 5-year-olds. He beat all of them. A year later, it was rumored that he was lost in the village the family lived in. In fact, he was found at the local ski area, just about to start his third time around a 9-kilometer loop. Alsgaard says that his passion for skiing comes from liking to be outdoors.

Athletic career
Alsgaard got his international breakthrough in the Lillehammer 1994 Winter Olympics winning the 30 kilometre freestyle event. In total, Alsgaard won 15 medals in the Winter Olympics and FIS Nordic World Ski Championships, making him one of the most successful skiers of all time. Excluding his World Championships debut in 1993, Alsgaard won at least one gold medal at every Olympic Games and World Championships that he participated from 1994 to 2003. Alsgaard retired from racing after the 2003 World Championships.

He won the Holmenkollen medal in 2001 (shared with Adam Małysz and Bente Skari).

After his career as a professional skier
Alsgaard retired from racing in 2003. Between 2013 and 2017 he was the owner and manager of a ski team, Team LeasePlan.

He now works as a technical advisor for Alpina Sports, working in the Nordic boot department.

He is also known as a sports commentator for the Norwegian Broadcasting Corporation.

In the Norwegian Championship in January 2011, Alsgaard took a sensational bronze medal at the 15 km classical individual race, defeating many skiers on the Norwegian World Cup team. He was only beaten by Eldar Rønning (gold) and Martin Johnsrud Sundby (silver). He repeated the feat in 2012, expressing frustration with the lack of aggressiveness and initiative in both the younger elite athletes and the team surrounding them.

Ski Classics team owner
As of December 2016 the team consists of four "allround" skiers and six skiers with langløp (or long races) as their specialty; Swede Lina Korsgren is the team's only female (as of 2016); Hans Kristian Stadheim assists in coaching. On 21 April 2017, Alsgaard announced that Team LeasePlan had to shut down due to sponsorship problems.

Cross-country skiing results
All results are sourced from the International Ski Federation (FIS).

Olympic Games
 6 medals – (5 gold, 1 silver)

World Championships
 9 medals – (6 gold, 2 silver, 1 bronze)

World Cup

Season titles
 3 titles – (1 overall, long distance, 1 sprint)

Season standings

Individual podiums
 13 victories 
 29 podiums

Team podiums

 12 victories – (12 ) 
 25 podiums – (24 , 1 )

Note:    Until the 1999 World Championships and the 1994 Olympics, World Championship and Olympic races were included in the World Cup scoring system.

Equipment
Alsgaard used skis from Madshus, one of Alpina's partners, with Alpina boots and Rottefella bindings.

See also
List of multiple Olympic gold medalists

References

Holmenkollen medalists – click Holmenkollmedaljen for downloadable pdf file 
Holmenkollen winners since 1892 – click Vinnere for downloadable pdf file 

1972 births
Cross-country skiers at the 1994 Winter Olympics
Cross-country skiers at the 1998 Winter Olympics
Cross-country skiers at the 2002 Winter Olympics
Holmenkollen medalists
Holmenkollen Ski Festival winners
Living people
Norwegian male cross-country skiers
Norwegian skiing and biathlon commentators
Olympic cross-country skiers of Norway
Olympic gold medalists for Norway
Olympic silver medalists for Norway
Olympic medalists in cross-country skiing
FIS Cross-Country World Cup champions
FIS Nordic World Ski Championships medalists in cross-country skiing
Medalists at the 2002 Winter Olympics
Medalists at the 1998 Winter Olympics
Medalists at the 1994 Winter Olympics
People from Akershus
Sportspeople from Viken (county)